This is a list of the gymnasts who represented their country at the 1968 Summer Olympics in Mexico City from 12–27 October 1968. Only one discipline, artistic gymnastics, was included in the Games.

Female artistic gymnasts

Male artistic gymnasts

References 

Lists of gymnasts
Gymnastics at the 1968 Summer Olympics